Weft is a basic component in weaving, used to turn thread into cloth, along with warp.

Weft or variant, may also refer to:

 Weft knitting, a major form of knitting
 Weft fern (Crepidomanes intricatum)
 WEFT (90.1 MHz), community radio station in Champaign, Illinois, USA
 War Eagle Flying Team (WEFT), Auburn University, Auburn, Alabama, USA
 Microsoft Web Embedding Fonts Tool (MS WEFT)

See also

 Warp (disambiguation)
 Warp and weft (disambiguation)